Chaubees Ghante aka 24 Ghante is a 1958 Hindi film directed by Dwarka Ghosla. It stars Premnath, Shakila, Nishi, K. N. Singh, Maruti, Shammi, Sheela Vaz, Kanchanmala. It had music by Bipin Babul and lyrics written by Raja Mehdi Ali Khan.

Plot

Cast

 Prem Nath
 Shakila
 K.N. Singh
 Maruti Rao
 Shammi
 Raj Kapoor
 Nishi
 Samson

Soundtrack

References

External links
 Chaubees Ghante at the Internet Movie Database

1958 films
1950s Hindi-language films